Collège d'Alma is a CEGEP in Alma, Quebec, Canada.

History
The college traces its origins to the merger of several institutions which became public ones in 1967, when the Quebec system of CEGEPs was created. In 1970, l'Externat classique d'Alma was renamed le Collège du Lac-Saint-Jean and began delivering pre-university training. In 1972, Collège d'Alma was created on the campus du Collège régional du Saguenay-Lac-Saint-Jean. In 1980, the institution became autonomous.

Programs
The CEGEP offers two types of programs: pre-university and technical. The pre-university programs, which take two years to complete, cover the subject matters which roughly correspond to the additional year of high school given elsewhere in Canada in preparation for a chosen field in university. The technical programs, which take three-years to complete, applies to students who wish to pursue a skill trade.

Gallery

See also
List of colleges in Quebec 
Higher education in Quebec

References

External links

 

Alma
Alma, Quebec
Buildings and structures in Saguenay–Lac-Saint-Jean
Education in Saguenay–Lac-Saint-Jean